"Saving face" is an idiom for preserving one's honor or prestige

Saving Face may refer to:
 Saving Face (2004 film), a 2004 American romantic comedy drama, named in reference to the sociological concept.
 Saving Face (2012 film), a 2012 documentary short film
 "Saving Face" (The Closer), an episode of The Closer
 "Saving Face" (Kappa Mikey), an episode of Kappa Mikey
 "Saving Face" (Law & Order: Criminal Intent), an episode of Law & Order: Criminal Intent
 Saving Face, a book by Gregg Kavet and Andy Robin
 "Saving Faces", a song by Orgy from Vapor Transmission

See also